Sat.1 emotions is a ProSiebenSat.1 Media pay-TV channel. It started broadcasting on May 3, 2012 at 8:15 pm. It replaced Sat.1 Comedy. ProSiebenSat.1 Media also operates the two pay-TV channels kabel eins classics and ProSieben Fun.

Sat.1 emotions broadcasts 24 hours a day, focussing on German soap operas, series and films. On some days international films and series are shown.

Distribution
Sat.1 emotions is available in Germany and Austria via cable and IPTV, depending on the cable network operator in SD and / or HD.

Until June 30, 2016 Sat.1 emotions was also available on the Sky Deutschland satellite platform.

Logos

Programming

Alex (2018–present)
Alisa – Folge deinem Herzen (2014–present)
Anna und die Liebe (2012–present)
Awake (2014, 2018)
Blindspot (2016–present)
Code Black (2016–present)
Commissario Montalbano (2014–present)
Crossing Lines (2013–present)
Danni Lowinski (2012–present)
Dark Blue (2013-2016)
Der Cop und der Snob (2012-2015, 2017)
Der letzte Bulle (2012–present)
Die Straßen von Berlin (2012-2014)
Dr. Molly & Karl (2012-2014)
Emily Owens, M.D. (Emily Owens) (2014-2016)
Extant (2017–present)
FlashForward (2017)
Flikken Maastricht (Cops Maastricht) (2017)
Frequency (2018–present)
Für alle Fälle Stefanie (2012)
George Gently (George Gently - Der Unbestechliche) (2017)
Hand aufs Herz (2012–present)
Hanna – Folge deinem Herzen (2014–present)
Homeland (2017–present)
Inspector Montalbano (Commissario Montalbano/Il Commissario Montalbano) (2014–present)
Jack Taylor (2015–present)
Klinik am Alex (2012-2013)
Knallerfrauen (2012–present)
Knallerkerle (2017)
Ladykracher (2012-2015)
Lotta in Love (2012–present)
Pastewka (2012-2015)
Profilage (Profiling Paris) (2015–present)
Remedy (2015-2016)
Rush (2017)
Schmetterlinge im Bauch (2012–present)
Second Chance (2018)
Section de recherches (Crime Scene Riviera) (2016–present)
Stalker (2015)
Syke (Nurses) (2016–present)
The Americans (2015–present)
The Defenders (2018–present)
The Ellen DeGeneres Show (2013-2014)
The Five (2017)
The Late Show with Stephen Colbert (2020–present)
The Mentalist (2014)
The Nanny (Die Nanny) (2017–present)
The Young Montalbano (Der junge Montalbano/Il giovane Montalbano) (2015–present)
This Is Us (2017–present)
Tyrant (2016–present)
Un passo dal cielo (Die Bergpolizei - Ganz nah am Himmel) (2018–present)
Vår Tid är Nu (The Restaurant) (2018–present)
Verliebt in Berlin (2012–present)
Verrückt nach Clara (2012, 2015, 2017)
Will & Grace (2014–present)

References

External links
 

Television stations in Germany
Television stations in Austria
German-language television stations
Television channels and stations established in 2012
2012 establishments in Germany
ProSiebenSat.1 Media
Mass media in Munich